Dato' Y. T. Lee, also Lee Yoon Thim (1905–1977) was a Malaysian Chinese architect active in Kuala Lumpur in the 1950s and 1960s. He helped "Build Merdeka" after Malaysian Independence, 1963. He moved in elite circles, and held several positions in the national government and in the Chinese community. He was a close friend to Prime Minister Tuanku Abdul Rahman and other political figures. He designed several of Kuala Lumpur's landmark buildings, such as: Chin Woo Stadium, UMNO building, Dewan Bahasa dan Pustaka, Federal Hotel, Kampung Baru Mosque, Ar-Rahman Mosque and the Masjid Al-Ubudiyah. In addition to his famous mosques in Kuala Lumpur, he also worked on middle eastern and Islamic architecture project, for example, Masjid Al- Ubudiyah in Kerling ( a modest mosque), Hulu Selangor  which is opened in 1960. When this masjid is built, there was no electricity supply yet. Somehow now it has been used as a teaching place by the locals. His less well known works include the Too House, an addition for the Methodist Boys School, and healthcare-related and commercial work. In the early 1960s, a series of honours came his way: in 1960, he was granted the appellation of P.J.K.; in 1961, he was honoured as Justice of Peace and J.M.N in 1962; he was honoured as Dato' in 1964, an honorific similar to the British "Sir".

Personal life 

In his early years, Lee traveled to England, Germany and Italy respectively for studies and earned a master's degree in Engineering. He returned to Malaysia and founded his own company, Y. T. Lee & Co. His ancestors came from Nanhai County, Canton Province.

Lee got married, and had at least three children, including two daughters. His children became professionals, one a doctor,
one an architect, and one a bank executive. His son, Mr. Lee Hong Fatt was the bank executive, and one daughter, Ms. Lee Chee 
Peng was an arts graduate of the University of Sydney.

Career as an administrator and politician 

Administrator

He was elected president of the Associated Chinese Chamber and Selangor Chinese Assembly Hall on 21 March 1958.

Politician
 
He was a member of Malaysia Chinese Association.  He has contributed a lot to the Chinese society in Malaysia and acted as one of the strong voices for the Chinese. He was also active in promoting Chinese education in the country and developing an independent Chinese high school.

Significant buildings 

Too House

The Too house was built in 1952, an Art Deco-style house located within the Golden Triangle business and commercial district.

Chin Woo Stadium

The sports complex is located at Jalan Hang Jebat, 50150, Kuala Lumpur. It is an international martial arts organisation which was built in 1953. The physical and spiritual philosophy of Chin Woo was first introduced to Malaya in the 1920 and founded in Shanghai in the 1910s by Huo Yuan Jia (Master Fok Yuen-Kap). The initialisation of project was officiated by Selangor Sultan Hisamuddin Alam Shah on 31 August 1951. The opening ceremony was officiated by Sir Mc Donald, the High Commissioner of Great Britain, witnessed by local leaders on 11 December 1953. Y. T. Lee is one of the committee of the opening ceremony of Chin Woo Stadium.

Methodist Boys School

This school was built on 16 November 1955. Sultan Hisamuddin Alam Shah took the key from the architect Mr Y.T. Lee to open the new $110,000 wing of the Methodist Boys School in Sentul, Kuala Lumpur. This school was founded by the late Rev. Preston L Peach in 1936, and the first batch of classes had seven students.
	
UMNO building

The rectangular four-story structure was built in 1955 to act as the headquarters for the UMNO (United Malays National Organisation) party. It is located on Jalan Tuanku Abdul Rahman.

Federal Hotel

The Federal Hotel was built in 1957 to accommodate the declaration of Merdeka, Malaya's independence Day. It was founded by Tan Sri Low Yat. An article written in 1971 presented Lee as an expert in hospitality design, and credited him with a total of four hotels, two of them in Bukit Bintang. Ar Azaiddy Abdullah writes that Lee worked with one of Kuala Lumpur's municipal architects, Eric Taylor, on the Merlin Hotel, 1957-1959. The hotel was later changed to the Concorde Hotel. Most of the original interiors have been reconfigured, including the once famous Harlequin Bar and Grill.

Dewan Bahasa dan Pustaka

The construction was completed on 31 January 1962. Its most prominent feature is a 65 by 25-foot glazed mosaic mural, designed by Ismail Mustam. The complex's layout on the prominent site was likened to the United Nations: a figural auditorium faces the traffic circle, and behind it lies the broad administrative block.

Masjid Jamek Kampung Baru

The building was officially opened on 12 July 1957. It can host up to 7,000 worshippers during the Muslim Friday prayer in the Malay village, Kampung Baru, that lies minutes away from the PETRONAS Towers. Its central feature is a large column-free prayer hall. One of the principal entrances is at a right angle to the qibla wall. The building's windows take the form of a modified Islamic arch, and there are onion domes, but otherwise the building is relatively free of decoration. With its thin pilasters and restrained geometric work, it is an early example of Islamic modernism. Masjid Jemek Mosque was under renovation during the year of 2015.

Masjid Ar-Rahman

It was officially opened on 23 August 1963 by Tuanku Syed Putra Al-Haj Ibni Almarhum Syed Hassan Jamalullail. The total cost of the building was $350,000. It was built to serve students at the University of Malaya. It was initially modern in its stylings, although subsequent renovations have made it look more traditional. It is located on Jalan Tuanku Abdul Rahman.

Masjid Al- Ubudiyah
This mosque in the small town of Kerling opened in 1964. When it was built, there was not initially electricity supplied to the building. It is an example of Middle Eastern and Islamic forms meshed with modernism. The repetitive patterns for the fencing, the rounded arch windows, and the pointed arches between the columns in Masjid Al- Ubudiyah show a similarity between the design and materials used in the Masjid Jamek Kampung Baru, Kuala Lumpur. A highly unusual feature of the mosque is the incorporation of a window in the mihrab.
Mosque in Kerling

Mosque in Kuala Kubu Bharu"""*Masjid India MosqueThe Masjid India is an Indian Muslim mosque located in Little India, Kuala Lumpur. It was officiated by the Sultan of Selangor in 1966, although the site was founded in 1863. The mosque was built through private donations collected from the Indian Muslim community. Lee was hired, and prepared working drawings for a "mosque and madrasa" on "Malay Street" in 1963 and 1964. The project proceeded at least as far as the architect's office advertised a tender notice. The client was the South Indian Muslim Committee on Jalan Mountbatten. The extent to which the existing Masjid India Mosque was designed by Lee is unclear, as it has clearly been renovated multiple times since the 1960s. There is a formal similarity in the exterior facades of the Masjid India and the Masjid Jamek Kampung Baru, suggesting that Lee worked on both of them.

 Other Buildings Tanjong Karang HospitalThe Tanjong Karang hospital is a rural government hospital located in Tanjong Karang, Selangore. It was built at a cost of RM 1.73 million and began operating in 1966 as the second phase of the rural development expenditure for medical and health services. It initial started with a total of 57 beds from 1966 to 1970.Y.W.C.A. BuildingThe hostel and assembly hall for Young Women Christian Association (Y.W.C.A.) was proposed by Lee Yoon Thim in 1952. It is located at Jalan Hang Jebat, Kuala Lumpur. It was built to provide safe and comfortable accommodation for young girls and women from all parts of Malaysia. As for assembly hall, it is used to organise events and programmes for less fortunate.Masjid NegeriThe project was proposed by Y.T. Lee & Co. in 1967. Masjid Negeri Mosque is located in Kuching, Sarawak. It was built in 1987 and completed by the year of 1990. The total built in area is about 100 acres. This mosque is one of the most significant landmarks of the State. It can accommodate 10.000 worshipers at a time.Community Hall Raub PahangThe project was proposed in 1961 by Y.T. Lee & Co. The building located at Jalan Cheroh Raub, Pahang.Office BuildingThis 6 storey office building was proposed by Y.T. Lee in  1954. It is located at lots 186-189, Jalan Ampang, Kuala Lumpur.Bank and Office Building'''

The 5 storey Bank and Office buildings can be found at lots 7-8 sec.48, Jalan Ipoh, Kuala Lumpur. It was proposed by Y.T. Lee in 1965.

Death 

Lee was one of the most important of a group of architects operating in the modernist idiom in Malaysia in the period after independence. He was a central figure for shaping the young country's global image. He was considered an expert in hotel design, deftly combining modernism with a local feel. Dato' Y.T. Lee died on 7 February 1977, at the age of 72, and was buried in the Chinese cemetery.

References

1905 births
1977 deaths
Malaysian architects
Malaysian Chinese Association politicians
Members of the Dewan Negara
Members of the Selangor State Legislative Assembly
Malaysian people of Chinese descent
Members of the Order of the Defender of the Realm
Companions of the Order of the Defender of the Realm